Roberto Williams Hodge Rivera (30 July 1944 – 12 August 1986) was a Chilean footballer who played as a midfielder.

Career
He played for Chile in the 1966 FIFA World Cup. He also played for Universidad de Chile, América, Tigres UANL and Tecos. Hodge died from pancreatic cancer in 1986.

References

External links
 FIFA profile
 
 Roberto Hodge at PlaymakerStats
 Roberto Hodge at PartidosdeLaRoja 

1944 births
1986 deaths
People from La Serena
Chilean footballers
Chilean expatriate footballers
Chile international footballers
Association football midfielders
Chilean Primera División players
Liga MX players
Primera B de Chile players
Universidad de Chile footballers
Club América footballers
Tigres UANL footballers
Tecos F.C. footballers
Club Deportivo Palestino footballers
C.D. Aviación footballers
Cobresal footballers
Chilean expatriate sportspeople in Mexico
Expatriate footballers in Mexico
1966 FIFA World Cup players